

Champions

Major League Baseball
World Series: St. Louis Cardinals over New York Yankees (4–3); Bob Gibson, MVP
All-Star Game, July 7 at Shea Stadium: National League, 7–4; Johnny Callison, MVP

Other champions
College World Series: Minnesota
Japan Series: Nankai Hawks over Hanshin Tigers (4–3)
Little League World Series: Mid Island, Staten Island, New York
Senior League World Series: Massapequa, New York

Awards and honors
Baseball Hall of Fame
Luke Appling
Red Faber
Burleigh Grimes
Miller Huggins
Tim Keefe
Heinie Manush
John Ward
Most Valuable Player
Brooks Robinson, Baltimore Orioles, 3B (AL)
Ken Boyer, St. Louis Cardinals, 3B (NL)
Cy Young Award
Dean Chance, Los Angeles Angels
Rookie of the Year
Tony Oliva, Minnesota Twins, OF (AL)
Dick Allen, Philadelphia Phillies, 3B (NL)
Gold Glove Award
Vic Power (1B) (AL) 
Bobby Richardson (2B) (AL) 
Brooks Robinson (3B) (AL) 
Luis Aparicio (SS) (AL) 
Jim Landis (OF) (AL) 
Al Kaline (OF) (AL) 
Vic Davalillo (OF) (AL)
Elston Howard (C) (AL) 
Jim Kaat (P) (AL)

MLB statistical leaders

Major league baseball final standings

American League final standings

National League final standings

Events

January
January 3 – The Reds announce that manager Fred Hutchinson has contracted lung cancer. He will begin two months of radiology treatment in Seattle and will make spring training with the team.
January 6:
Charlie Finley signs a two-year pact to move the Athletics‚ pending American League approval‚ from Kansas City, Missouri to Louisville, Kentucky.
The Chicago White Sox introduce their new powder-blue road uniforms.
January 15:
Major League Baseball executives vote to hold a free-agent draft in New York City. A new TV pact is also signed.
Willie Mays‚ the highest-paid player in baseball‚ signs a $105‚000 contract with the Giants.
January 16 – American League owners vote 9–1 against Charlie Finley's Louisville moving proposal. Finley is given an ultimatum to sign a lease in Kansas City or lose his franchise.
January 28 – Cincinnati Reds center fielder Vada Pinson is cleared of assault charges stemming from a September 5‚ 1963 incident when Cincinnati sportswriter Earl Lawson does not pursue charges further.
January 29 – Pitcher-writer Jim Brosnan is given permission by the Chicago White Sox to make his own deal with another team. His in-season writing has been censured by Sox general manager Ed Short.
January 30 – The United States Senate Subcommittee on Monopolies begins hearings on baseball.

February
February 2 – Red Faber, Burleigh Grimes, Tim Keefe, Heinie Manush, John Montgomery Ward, and Miller Huggins are elected to the Hall of Fame by the Special Veterans Committee.
February 13 - Chicago Cubs second baseman Ken Hubbs is killed in a plane crash.
February 17 – Former Chicago White Sox shortstop Luke Appling is selected to the Hall of Fame by the Baseball Writers' Association of America in a runoff election. In , the first year of eligibility for Appling, he received just two votes.

March
March 23:
Finally, Charlie Finley gives in to American League pressure and signs a four-year lease with the municipal government to keep the Athletics in Kansas City. Finley wanted two years. His exasperated AL colleagues voted 9-1 that KC's offer was reasonable.
The San Francisco Giants sign pitcher Masanori Murakami‚ third baseman Tatsuhiko Tanaka‚ and catcher Hiroshi Takahashi, the first Japanese ballplayers ever to play for American teams. Murakami played for the Fresno Giants and later the MLB Giants, while Tanaka and Takahashi played for the Magic Valley Cowboys.

April
April 1 - Cleveland Indians manager Birdie Tebbetts suffered a heart attack. George Strickland will fill in for three months until the 51-year old skipper returns to the team with limited duties.
April 8 – Houston Colt .45s relief pitcher Jim Umbricht dies of cancer at the age of 33. In 1965, the franchise, by then known as the Astros, would retire his number.
April 9 - Much to the chagrin of team executive Branch Rickey the St. Louis Cardinals traded Jimmie Coker and Gary Kolb to the Milwaukee Braves for catcher Bob Uecker. After introducing himself, The Redbirds' new backstop is quickly informed by Rickey. "I didn't want you, I wouldn't trade one Gary Kolb for a hundred Bob Ueckers".
April 10 - Demolition of the Polo Grounds in Manhattan began, with the same wrecking ball that demolished Ebbets Field in Brooklyn four years earlier.
April 13 - After beating The Cincinnati Reds 6-3 in the traditional home opener in Cincinnati. Houston was in first place for the only time as the Houston Colt 45s. The next year they were known as The Houston Astros, in reflection of the NASA space program.
April 14 – Sandy Koufax goes all the way in his only opening day start, allowing no walks and beating the St. Louis Cardinals, 4–0. at Dodger Stadium. Frank Howard homers for the Dodgers.
April 17 – The New York Mets play their first game at brand-new Shea Stadium and lose 4–3 to the Pittsburgh Pirates. Willie Stargell hits the first home run in the stadium's history, a second-inning solo shot off the Mets' Jack Fisher. In the first-ever "Kiner's Korner" from Shea, Ralph Kiner's guest is Casey Stengel.
April 19 - The Mets win their first of 1,859 victories at Shea Stadium as they beat The Pirates 6-0 behind Al Jackson's 6-hitter.
April 23 – At Colt Stadium, Ken Johnson of the Houston Colt .45's no-hits his former team, the Cincinnati Reds, but loses 1–0. Two ninth-inning errors allow the Reds to score the game's lone run: a two-base throwing error by Johnson himself on Pete Rose's ground ball, and the second by Nellie Fox on Vada Pinson's grounder, which scores Rose. To date, the game is the only one in Major League history whose losing pitcher had pitched a nine-inning no-hitter.

May

May 2 – The Minnesota Twins became the third club in MLB history to hit four consecutive home runs in the same inning, as Tony Oliva, Bob Allison, Jimmie Hall and Harmon Killebrew went deep in the top of the 11th inning in a 7–3 victory against the Kansas City Athletics. The Twins also became the first team to hit at least three consecutive home runs in an extra innings game. 
 May 6 – Dave Nicholson of the Chicago White Sox hit a home run off of Kansas City Athletics' pitcher Moe Drabowsky which either bounced atop the left-field roof of Comiskey Park or was said to have entirely cleared it. The home run was officially measured at 573 feet, one of baseball's longest of all time.
May 31 – The second game of a double header at Shea Stadium between the San Francisco Giants and New York Mets lasts 23 innings. The Giants eventually win it, 8–6.

June

June 4 – Sandy Koufax pitches the third of his four career no hitters, to pace the Los Angeles Dodgers to a 3–0 victory over the Philadelphia Phillies at Connie Mack Stadium.
June 15 – The Chicago Cubs trade Lou Brock, Jack Spring and Paul Toth to the St. Louis Cardinals for Ernie Broglio, Doug Clemens and Bobby Shantz. The swap eventually gains notoriety as perhaps the most lopsided in the history of baseball, as Brock goes on to a Hall of Fame career in St. Louis while Broglio posts a 7–19 record in a Cubs uniform.
June 21 – On Father's Day at Shea Stadium, Jim Bunning fans ten, drives in two runs, and pitches the first perfect game (excluding Don Larsen's 1956 World Series effort, and Harvey Haddix's  extra-innings loss) since Charlie Robertson's on April 30, as the Philadelphia Phillies beat the New York Mets 6–0. Bunning also becomes the first pitcher to throw no-hitters in both leagues, and Gus Triandos becomes the first catcher to catch a no-hitter in each league. Bunning throws just 90 pitches in winning his second no-hitter. The next time Bunning faces the Mets he will shut them out, the first no-hit pitcher in the 20th century to do that. The Mets fare little better in the nightcap, as 18-year-old rookie Rick Wise pitches into the seventh inning to win his first game, giving up just three hits and three walks (Johnny Klippstein pitched the final three innings). The Phillies increase their National League lead to two games over the San Francisco Giants.

July
July 7 – At Shea Stadium, Johnny Callison's ninth-inning three-run home run off Dick Radatz caps a four-run rally and gives the National League a 7–4 win over the American League in the All-Star Game. Callison is named Game MVP as the NL triumph evens the series at 17.
July 15 – At Metropolitan Stadium, Minnesota Twins pitcher Mudcat Grant serves up thirteen singles and a walk during eight innings—but none of the Washington Senators batters comes around to score.  The totals in Grant's 6-0 shutout win rank one behind the major league record.
July 19 – Luis Tiant pitches a complete-game, four-hit shutout in his Major League debut, leading the Cleveland Indians to a 3–0 victory over Whitey Ford and the New York Yankees at Yankee Stadium. Tiant allowed just four singles while striking out eleven.
July 23 – Bert Campaneris of the Kansas City Athletics became the second player in Major League history to hit two home runs in his Major League debut, joining Bob Nieman, who did it in the  season.

August
August 12 – Mickey Mantle hits a home run from both sides of the plate in a 7–3 Yankees win over the Chicago White Sox. It is the tenth time in his career that he has done so and a major league record for switch-hit homers in a game.
August 20 – At Comiskey Park, the Chicago White Sox complete a four-game sweep of the New York Yankees with a 5–0 shutout. As the Yankees' team bus heads to O'Hare International Airport after the game, infielder Phil Linz takes out a harmonica and plays a plaintive version of "Mary Had a Little Lamb." Manager Yogi Berra tells Linz to put the harmonica away. After Linz asks what Berra had said, Mickey Mantle tells Linz to "play it louder", which he does, prompting an unusually angry Berra to storm to the back to the bus and slap the harmonica out of Linz' hands; the instrument strikes Joe Pepitone's knee. The "Harmonica Incident" convinces the Yankee front office that Berra has lost control of the team and cannot command respect from his players. As a result, the decision is made to fire Berra at the end of the season.
August 27 – The New York Mets sign Jerry Koosman as an amateur free agent.
August 31 – Ground breaking is held for the new Anaheim Stadium.

September
September 1 – At Shea Stadium, pitcher Masanori Murakami of the San Francisco Giants becomes the first Japanese player to appear in the Major Leagues. He enters the game in the ninth inning of the Giants' 4–1 loss to the New York Mets and strikes out Charley Smith, the first batter he faces; Ed Kranepool also strikes out two batters later.
September 9 – The St. Louis Cardinals and Philadelphia Phillies go into extra innings at Connie Mack Stadium tied at five. An error by Dick Allen leads to three unearned runs as the Cards score five in the eleventh for a 10–5 victory.
September 12 – Frank Bertaina of the Baltimore Orioles beats Bob Meyer of the Kansas City Athletics, 1–0, in a game in which both pitchers throw a one-hitter.
September 17 - Seattle Mayor J.D. Braman announces publicly his intentions on luring the Cleveland Indians to the city. The following month, the Indians' board of directors announce the club will remain in Cleveland. 
September 20 – Jim Bunning strikes out Johnny Roseboro in the ninth inning to preserve the Philadelphia Phillies' 3–2 win over the Los Angeles Dodgers in Los Angeles. The win comes after two straight losses (both charged to Jack Baldschun) and leaves the first place Phils in front of the National League by six and a half games with 12 games to play. When they return to Philadelphia in the early morning, 2,000 fans, including mayor James Tate are on hand to greet the team.
September 21 – John Tsitouris hurls a 1–0 shutout for the Cincinnati Reds over Art Mahaffey and the first-place Phillies, launching a 10-game Phillies losing streak. Rookie Chico Ruiz scores the only run when, with Frank Robinson at bat, he steals home with two outs in the sixth inning.
September 27 – Johnny Callison hits three home runs, but the Phillies lose to the Milwaukee Braves 14–8. The Phils suffer the seventh loss in their 10-game losing streak, while the Reds sweep the New York Mets (4–1 and 3–1). These results knock Philadelphia out of first place, with the Reds replacing them atop the NL standings. The Phillies would never return to first place in 1964.
September 29 – The Pittsburgh Pirates blank the Reds 2–0 at Crosley Field (despite the Reds getting 11 hits off Bob Friend) to end the Reds' nine-game winning streak. Meanwhile, Ray Sadecki records his 20th victory as his St. Louis Cardinals defeat the Phillies 4–2 at Busch Stadium, the seventh win in the Cardinals' eight-game winning streak and the ninth loss in the Phillies' 10-game losing streak. The win puts the Cardinals into a tie for first place with the Reds; St. Louis had been 11 games out of first on August 23.

October
October 3 – The New York Yankees clinch their 14th American League pennant in 16 years with an 8–3 victory over the Cleveland Indians, holding off the Chicago White Sox by a single game.
October 3 – As a result of the now-concluded Phillies' 10-game losing streak, this day begins with four teams still having a mathematical shot at the NL pennant, and it is still mathematically possible to get a 4-way tie for such. But then one of those four teams, the San Francisco Giants, is eliminated with a 10–7 loss to the Chicago Cubs. At the end of the day's play, the Reds and the Cardinals are tied for 1st place, with the Phillies a game back. In recent days, the NL has had to scramble to schedule various possible playoffs.
October 4 – The Phillies defeat the Reds, 10–0, in the last regular-season game for both teams unless there is a playoff; because of the Reds' loss, the Cardinals clinch a tie for the NL pennant. At the end of that game, the Phillies and Reds are 1/2 game back of the Cardinals, and await the result of the Cardinals-Mets game. Then, the Cardinals, never in first place until the last week of the season, clinch their first pennant since 1946 with an 11–5 win over the Mets, who had just beaten the Cardinals twice in the two preceding days. The win by the Cardinals averts a three-way tie for the NL pennant, with the Phillies and the Reds finishing one game back in a second-place tie.
October 11 – a team of U.S. college baseball players defeats a Japanese amateur all-star team, 6–2, in the lone game of baseball at the 1964 Summer Olympics, featured as a demonstration sport.
October 14 – The Los Angeles Dodgers released Jim Gilliam and Lee Walls.
October 15 – The St. Louis Cardinals take an early lead in the deciding World Series Game Seven over the New York Yankees. Lou Brock hits a fifth-inning home run to give pitcher Bob Gibson a 6-0 lead. Mickey Mantle, Clete Boyer and Phil Linz homer for New York, but the Yankees fall short. The Cardinals win the game 7–5 and are the World Champions. The Boyer brothers, Ken for St. Louis and Clete for the Yankees, homer in their last World Series appearance, a first in major league history.
October 16 – The day after the final game of the World Series, the managerial posts of both pennant winning teams are vacant. In the morning, Johnny Keane, manager of the victorious St. Louis Cardinals, resigns, much to the surprise of owner Gussie Busch. Hours later, New York Yankee general manager Ralph Houk fires Yogi Berra as his manager, citing Berra's lack of control over team and his inability to command respect from his players. Less than a week later, Houk replaces Berra with Keane, who himself will be replaced (as St. Louis manager) by coach and former Cardinal star Red Schoendienst. Meanwhile, Berra reunites with Casey Stengel by becoming a coach with the New York Mets.

November
November 2 – CBS Broadcasting Inc. becomes the first corporate owner of a Major League team after buying eighty percent of the New York Yankees assets for $11,200,000.
November 10 – The Braves sign a 25-year lease to play in the new Atlanta–Fulton County Stadium.
November 18 – Baltimore Orioles third baseman Brooks Robinson, who hit .317 with 28 home runs and 118 RBI, is named American League Most Valuable Player with 269 points, becoming the first non-Yankee to win the award since Nellie Fox of the Chicago White Sox in 1959. The Yankees' Mickey Mantle (171) and his Yankee teammate Elston Howard (124) are the runners-up.
November 24 – St. Louis Cardinals third baseman Ken Boyer, who hit .295 with 24 home runs and 119 RBI, is named National League Most Valuable Player with 243 points. The Phillies' Johnny Callison (187) and Boyer's Cardinal teammate Bill White (106) are the runners-up.

December
December 1 – The Houston Colt .45s officially change their nickname to Astros. The change coincides with the team's impending move from Colt Stadium to the Harris County Domed Stadium, also known as the Astrodome. A change in name for the three-year-old franchise is necessitated due to a dispute with the Colt firearm company; the Astros name is chosen due to Houston being the home of NASA's Manned Spacecraft Center (later the Lyndon B. Johnson Space Center).
December 4:
The Minnesota Twins acquire extremely versatile utility César Tovar from the Cincinnati Reds in exchange for pitcher Gerry Arrigo. Tovar will play eight seasons in Minnesota.
MLB owners decide to use a free agent draft beginning in January . The inverse order of the previous year's standings will be used to select players every four months.

Births

January
January 2 – Colby Ward
January 3 – Howard Hilton
January 3 – Luis Rivera
January 3 – Russ Swan
January 7 – Allan Anderson
January 7 – Dave Meads
January 9 – Stan Javier
January 13 – José Núñez
January 13 – Billy Jo Robidoux
January 15 – Jeff Banister
January 17 – Jeff Tabaka
January 18 – Brady Anderson
January 19 – Mark Grater
January 19 – Jim Morris
January 20 – Ozzie Guillén
January 22 – Wayne Kirby
January 24 – Rob Dibble
January 25 – Francisco Meléndez
January 28 – Fredi González
January 29 – John Habyan
January 30 – Hipólito Peña

February
February 4 – Jeff Gardner
February 7 – Bien Figueroa
February 8 – Edgar Díaz
February 9 – Ed Whited
February 12 – Joe Bitker
February 12 – Cameron Drew
February 13 – Dann Howitt
February 14 – Keith Brown
February 14 – Bill McGuire
February 16 – Rico Rossy
February 17 – Mike Campbell
February 18 – Kevin Tapani
February 24 – René Arocha
February 25 – Rich Rowland

March
March 2 – Tim Layana
March 3 – Marvin Hudson
March 4 – Tom Lampkin
March 7 – Wayne Edwards
March 8 – Lance McCullers
March 13 – Will Clark
March 19 – Jeff Hamilton
March 26 – Mike Loynd
March 28 – Mike Fitzgerald
March 31 – Chris Cron
March 31 – Balvino Gálvez
March 31 – Rafael Montalvo

April
April 2 – Pete Incaviglia
April 6 – Kenny Williams
April 9 – Blaise Ilsley
April 10 – Eric King
April 11 – Amalio Carreño
April 11 – Bret Saberhagen
April 11 – Wally Whitehurst
April 12 – Jerry Goff
April 12 – Mike Macfarlane
April 13 – Doug Strange
April 19 – Scott Kamieniecki
April 20 – Jimmy Jones
April 22 – Jack Savage
April 25 – Blaine Beatty
April 28 – Barry Larkin
April 28 – Eric Nolte
April 30 – Jeff Reboulet

May
May 1 – Dan Gakeler
May 1 – José Lind
May 8 – Dave Rohde
May 11 – Billy Bean
May 11 – Trenidad Hubbard
May 11 – Jeff Sellers
May 11 – Bobby Witt
May 11 – Floyd Youmans
May 17 – Rob Nelson
May 19 – Luis Aquino
May 20 – Gordon Dillard
May 20 – Jeff Schwarz
May 23 – Gino Minutelli
May 26 – Willie Fraser
May 28 – Duane Ward

June
June 3 – Nelson Liriano
June 4 – Steve Searcy
June 6 – Edgar Cáceres
June 11 – Ron Jones
June 18 – Tommy Hinzo
June 21 – Brad Moore
June 22 – Jim Hunter
June 28 – Mark Grace
June 28 – Kevin Reimer
June 30 – Doug Dascenzo

July
July 2 – Jose Canseco
July 2 – Ozzie Canseco
July 2 – Joe Magrane
July 3 – Warren Newson
July 8 – Bob Kipper
July 8 – Ken Patterson
July 12 – Mike Schwabe
July 13 – Greg Litton
July 14 – Darren Hall
July 15 – Steve Cummings
July 20 – Mark Lee
July 20 – Jim Lewis
July 24 – Barry Bonds
July 25 – José Bautista
July 28 – Bob Milacki
July 28 – Terry Taylor

August
August 2 – Cliff Young
August 3 – Kevin Elster
August 4 – Rubén Rodríguez
August 4 – B. J. Surhoff
August 10 – Andy Stankiewicz
August 10 – Bill Wilkinson
August 13 – Jay Buhner
August 13 – Gary Cooper 
August 13 – Tom Prince
August 14 – Mark Leonard
August 14 – Tommy Shields
August 15 – Jeff Huson
August 16 – Rick Reed
August 21 – Shawn Hillegas
August 22 – Mike Everitt
August 23 – Jeff Manto
August 24 – Kip Gross
August 26 – Chad Kreuter

September
September 1 – Luis Lopez
September 1 – David West
September 5 – Ron Rightnowar
September 6 – Mike York
September 7 – Sergio Valdez
September 10 – Joe Kraemer
September 11 – Ellis Burks
September 13 – Greg Hibbard
September 17 – Jim Pena
September 18 – Dan Murphy
September 24 – Jim Neidlinger
September 24 – Rafael Palmeiro
September 26 – Dave Martinez
September 26 – Joe Skalski
September 30 – Doug Jennings
September 30 – Scott Lusader

October
October 1 – Roberto Kelly
October 2 – Randy Byers
October 2 – Héctor Villanueva
October 4 – John Kiely
October 4 – Mark McLemore
October 5 – Terry Mathews
October 7 – Jim Bruske
October 7 – Rich DeLucia
October 13 – Chris Gwynn
October 14 – Joe Girardi
October 15 – John Barfield
October 19 – Mike Pérez
October 22 – Gerald Young
October 25 – Takehiro Ishii
October 26 – Steve Adkins
October 28 – Lenny Harris
October 31 – Steve Rosenberg

November
November 1 – Eddie Williams
November 9 – Kevin Mmahat
November 10 – Shawn Holman
November 10 – Keith Lockhart
November 10 – Junior Noboa
November 10 – Kenny Rogers
November 11 – Roberto Hernández
November 12 – Dave Otto
November 12 – Gary Thurman
November 15 – Daryl Irvine
November 16 – Rob Mallicoat
November 16 – Dwight Gooden
November 17 – Mitch Williams
November 23 – José González
November 24 – Bob Malloy
November 25 – Mark Davis
November 28 – Craig Wilson
November 28 – John Burkett

December
December 2 – Chip Hale
December 3 – Jeff Carter
December 3 – Steve Carter
December 3 – Darryl Hamilton
December 5 – Gene Harris
December 6 – Kevin Campbell
December 11 – Thomas Howard
December 12 – Alonzo Powell
December 13 – Steve Wilson
December 14 – Mitch Lyden
December 16 – Billy Ripken
December 19 – Mike Fetters
December 22 – Mike Jackson
December 24 – Carlos Diaz
December 24 – Tim Drummond
December 26 – Jeff King
December 29 – Craig Grebeck
December 29 – Curt Hasler
December 29 – Rod Nichols

Deaths

January
January [?] – Al Cabrera, 82, Spaniard shortstop for the St. Louis Cardinals during the 1912 season.
January 13 – Margaret Stefani, 46, All-Star infielder in the 1943 inaugural season of the All-American Girls Professional Baseball League.
January 15 – Ed Henderson, 79, who pitched in 1914 with the Pittsburgh Rebels and the Indianapolis Hoosiers of the Federal League.
January 15 – Bob Larmore, 67, backup shortstop for the 1918 St. Louis Cardinals.
January 16 – Howard Baker, 75, third baseman who played for the Cleveland Naps, Chicago White Sox and New York Giants in parts of three seasons spanning 1912-1915.
January 17 – John Grimes, 94, who pitched in three games for the 1897 St. Louis Browns.

February
February 4 – Fred Smith, 85, pitcher for the 1907 Cincinnati Reds.
February 12 – Ted Pawelek, 44, catcher for the Chicago Cubs who played four MLB games during the 1946 season.
February 12 – Al Pierotti, 68, pitcher for the Boston Braves from 1920–1921, who was also an offensive lineman in the American Professional Football League from 1920 through 1929.
February 14 – Bill Stewart, 69, National League umpire from 1933 to 1954 who worked four World Series, four All-Star Games and the 1951 NL pennant playoff; also a hockey coach and referee who led the Chicago Black Hawks to the 1938 Stanley Cup title.
February 15 – Ken Hubbs, 22, Gold Glove-winning second baseman for the Chicago Cubs and the 1962 National League Rookie of the Year, in the crash of his private plane.
February 15 – Fred Trautman, 71, pitcher for the 1915 Newark Peppers of the Federal League.
February 22 – Kid Butler, 76, infielder for the 1907 St. Louis Browns.
February 22 – Ike Samuels, 90, third baseman for the 1895 St. Louis Browns of the National League.
February 24 – Henry Baldwin, 69, backup infielder for the 1927 Philadelphia Phillies.
February 27 – Tony Smith, 79, shortstop for the AL Washington Senators (1907) and the NL Brooklyn Superbas/Dodgers (1910–1911).

March
March 2 – Fred Vaughn, 45, second baseman for the AL Washington Senators over parts of two seasons from 1944–1945.
March 3 – Lefty Scott, 48, pitcher for the Philadelphia Phillies in the 1945 season.
March 10 – Warren Shanabrook, 83, third baseman for the 1906 Washington Senators.
March 13 – Mack Allison, 77, pitcher who played from 1911 through 1913 for the St. Louis Browns of the American League.
March 19 – John Henry Lloyd, 79, Hall of Fame shortstop of the Negro leagues who was dubbed as the black Honus Wagner.

April
April 1 – Casey Hageman, 76, who pitched from 1911 through 1914 for the Boston Red Sox, St. Louis Cardinals and Chicago Cubs.
April 5 – Bob Clemens, 77,  outfielder who played with the St. Louis Browns in 1914.
April 7 – Johnny Tillman, 70, pitcher who played for the St. Louis Browns in 1915.
April 8 – George Moriarty, 79, third baseman who played 1,075 gams for four MLB clubs, notably the 1909–1915 Detroit Tigers, and American League umpire (1917–1926 and 1929–1940), interrupting his officiating tenure to serve a two-year term as manager of 1927–1928 Tigers.
April 8 – Mickey O'Neil, 63, catcher for the Boston Braves, Brooklyn Robins, Washington Senators and New York Giants, in a span of nine seasons from 1919–1927.
April 8 – Jim Umbricht, 33, relief pitcher for the Houston Colt .45s, who battled back from cancer surgery to post a 4–3 record for the club in 1963.
April 10 – Chief Yellow Horse, 66, pitcher for the Pittsburgh Pirates from 1921 to 1922; a Native American from the Pawnee tribe who was the first full-blooded American Indian to have played in Major League Baseball history.
April 13 – Ed Pipgras, 59, pitcher in five games for the 1932 Brooklyn Dodgers; his brother was a mound star for the "Murderers' Row" Yankees of the late 1920s.
April 14 – Enos Kirkpatrick, 79, third baseman who played from 1912 through 1915 for the Brooklyn Dodgers/Superbas and the Baltimore Terrapins.
April 16 – Charlie Case, 84, pitcher who played with the Cincinnati Reds in 1901 and for the Pittsburgh Pirates in 1906.
April 16 – Gus Williams, 75, outfielder for the St. Louis Browns during five seasons from 1911–1915.
April 17 – Kid Willson, 78, outfielder who played for the Chicago White Sox in part of two seasons spanning 1918–1927.
April 20 – Eddie Dyer, 64, pitcher (1922–1927) and manager (1946–1950) for the St. Louis Cardinals who guided the team to the 1946 World Series title.
April 22 – Herb Herring, 72, who made one pitching appearance for the  Washington Senators in the 1912 season.

May
May 3 – Gerry Shea, 82, catcher for the 1905 St. Louis Cardinals. 
May 9 – Chauncey Burkam, 71, pinch hitter for the St. Louis Browns in the 1915 season.
May 10 – Charlie Butler, pitcher for the 1933 Philadelphia Phillies.
May 10 – George McConnell, 86, spitball specialist who pitched for five teams in a span of six seasons from 1909–1916.
May 14 – Dave Altizer, 87, shortstop who played from 1906 through 1911 for four teams, most relevantly with the Washington Senators; one of the few major leaguers to have served in the United States Army during the Boxer Rebellion of 1899–1901.
May 15 – Harley Boss, 55, first baseman who played for the Washington Senators and the Cleveland Indians in part of four seasons spanning 1928–1933.
May 16 – Buzz Arlett, 65, called the Babe Ruth of the Minor Leagues; slugging outfielder/pitcher who hit .341 with 432 home runs and 1,976 RBI in a 19-year career, while posting a 108–93 pitching record with a 3.39 ERA; played in 121 games in the majors with the Philadelphia Phillies in 1931, batting .313 with 131 hits. 
May 20 – Frank Moore, 86, pitcher for the 1905 Pittsburgh Pirates. 
May 20 – Cy Neighbors, 83, outfielder for the 1908 Pittsburgh Pirates.
May 23 – Ernie Wolf, 75, pitcher who played for the Cleveland Naps in 1912.
May 25 – Joe Martin, 88, backup outfielder who played for the Washington Senators and St. Louis Browns in the 1903 season.
May 27 – Lou Jorda, 71, National League umpire who officiated in 2,508 contests over 18 seasons (1927–1931, 1940–1952), as well as in two World Series and two All-Star games.
May 28 – Buzzy Wares, 78, shortstop for the St. Louis Browns from 1913–1914, later a longtime coach for the St. Louis Cardinals from 1930–1952, during which time the Cardinals won seven National League pennants and five World Series titles.
May 29 – Eli Cates, 87, pitcher for the 1908 Washington Senators.
May 31 – Rabbit Warstler, 60, middle infielder who played from 1930 through 1940 for the Boston Red Sox, Philadelphia Athletics, Boston Bees and Chicago Cubs.

June
June 2 – Jack Kading, 79, first baseman who played with the Pittsburgh Pirates in 1910 and for the Chicago Chi-Feds in 1914.
June 7 – Elmer Stricklett, 87, pitcher who played from 1904 through 1907 for the Chicago White Sox and Brooklyn Superbas.
June 11 – Jack Blott, 61, catcher for the 1924 Cincinnati Reds, as well as a football coach in the Michigan and Wesleyan universities from 1924 through 1940.
June 12 – Bud Connolly, 63, shortstop for the 1925 Boston Red Sox.
June 12 – Walter Zink, 66, pitcher for the 1921 New York Giants.
June 15 – Jim Spotts, 55, catcher who appeared in three games at age 21 for the 1930 Philadelphia Phillies.
June 16 – Dick Culler, 49, middle infielder and third baseman who played for the Philadelphia Athletics, Chicago White Sox, Boston Braves, Chicago Cubs and New York Giants in all or part of eight seasons spanning 1936–1949. 
June 27 – Tex Wisterzil, 76, third baseman who played from 1914 to 1915 for the Brooklyn Tip-Tops, Chicago Whales and St. Louis Terriers of the outlaw Federal League.

July
July 1 – Jay Rogers, 75, backup catcher for the 1914 New York Yankees.
July 5 – Dick Attreau, 67, first baseman who played from 1926 to 1927 with the Philadelphia Phillies.
July 7 – Glenn Gardner, 48, pitcher who played for the St. Louis Cardinals in the 1945 season. 
July 19 – Len Swormstedt, 85, pitcher for the Cincinnati Reds and the Boston Americans from 1901 to 1906.
July 20 – Bill Schardt, 78, pitcher who played from 1911 to 1912 for the Brooklyn Dodgers. 
July 22 – Bill Narleski, 64, shortstop who played in 135 games from 1929 to 1930 for the Boston Red Sox; father of Ray Narleski.
July 26 – Harry Smith, 74, pitcher for the 1912 Chicago White Sox.
July 27 – Dominic Mulrenan, 70, pitcher for the 1921 Chicago White Sox.
July 27 – Lizzie Murphy, 70, billed as the Queen of Baseball, who played at first base in an exhibition game against the Boston Red Sox at Fenway Park on August 14, 1922, to become the first woman to play against a Major League Baseball team.
July 29 – Vean Gregg, 79, pitcher for the 1915 and 1916 World Series Champions Boston Red Sox, who posted a career record of 92-63 with a 2.70 ERA, and also led the American League in ERA in 1911.

August
August 4 – Jerry Standaert, 62, backup infielder who played for the Brooklyn Robins and Boston Red Sox in a span of three seasons from 1925–1929.
August 5 – Ed Coleman, 62, right fielder who played from 1932 through 1936 for the Philadelphia Athletics and St. Louis Browns.
August 6 – Curly Ogden, 63, pitcher who played from 1922 through 1926 for the Philadelphia Athletics and Washington Senators; member of 1924 world champion Senators.
August 9 – Pete Johns, 76, backup infielder who played  for the Chicago White Sox and St. Louis Browns between 1915 and 1918.
August 17 – Happy Felsch, 72, center fielder and one of eight players banned from baseball for life for his role in the 1919 Black Sox Scandal.
August 21 – J. L. Wilkinson, 86, owner of the Negro league Kansas City Monarchs from 1920 to 1948.
August 30 – Bob Jones, 74, third baseman for the Detroit Tigers during nine seasons from 1917–1925.

September
September 3 – Hank Ritter, 70, pitcher for the Philadelphia Phillies and New York Giants  in a span of four seasons from 1912–1916.
September 5 – Fred Stem, 78, first baseman who played for the Boston Doves from 1908 to 1909.
September 8 – Buck Redfern, 62, backup infielder for the Chicago White Sox in the 1928 and 1929 seasons.
September 9 – Herschel Bennett, 67, outfielder who played for the St. Louis Browns from 1923 through 1927.
September 9 – George Stueland, 65, pitcher for the Chicago Cubs in part of four season from 1921–1925.
September 11 – Red McDermott, 75, outfielder for the 1912 Detroit Tigers.
September 11 – Tom Meany, 60, sportswriter for six New York newspapers, as well as Collier's magazine from 1923 to 1956; also publicity and promotions director for the New York Mets since their 1961 formation.
September 16 – Herb Conyers, 43, first baseman who played in seven games for the Cleveland Indians in 1950; batting average champion of four different minor leagues between 1942 and 1948. 
September 18 – Frank Barron, 74, pitcher for the 1914 Washington Senators.
September 22 – Red Torkelson, 70, pitcher for the Cleveland Indians in 1917.
September 23 – Cy Barger, 79, dead ball era pitcher who played with four teams in three different leagues in a span of seven seasons from 1906–1915.
September 26 – Paul Zahniser, 68, pitcher for the Washington Senators, Boston Red Sox, and Cincinnati Reds from 1923 to 1929.
September 27 – Jud McLaughlin, 52, pitcher for the Boston Red Sox between 1931 and 1933.

October
October 6 – Dan Adams, 77, pitcher who played from 1914 to 1915 for the  Kansas City Packers of the Federal League. 
October 6 – Barney Schreiber, 82, pitcher for the 1911 Cincinnati Reds.
October 7 – Charlie Armbruster, 84, backup catcher who played from 1905 through 1907 for the Boston Americans and the Chicago White Sox.
October 9 – Al Wingo, 66, outfielder for the Philadelphia Athletics and Detroit Tigers in a span of six seasons from 1919–1928, before joining the San Francisco Seals of the Pacific Coast League from 1929 to 1931.
October 11 – Stan Gray, 75,  first baseman who played for the Pittsburgh Pirates in 1912.
October 13 – Scrappy Moore, 71, third baseman for the 1917 St. Louis Browns. 
October 17 – Carson Bigbee, 69, outfielder who spent his entire Major League career with the Pittsburgh Pirates from 1916 through 1926, including the Pirates team that won the 1925 World Series title.
October 19 – Grover Hartley, 76, long time backup catcher and coach who played for seven different clubs of the American and National leagues during eleven seasons spanning 1911–1934. 
October 20 – John Whitehead, 55, pitcher who played for the Chicago White Sox and St. Louis Browns in a span of seven seasons between 1935 and 1942. 
October 31 – Phyllis Bookout, 29,  All-American Girls Professional Baseball League player.

November
November 5 – Dutch Stryker, 69, pitcher who played with the Boston Braves in 1924 and for the Brooklyn Robins in 1926.
November 6 – Buz Phillips, 60, pitcher in 14 games for the 1930 Philadelphia Phillies.
November 11 – Oscar Stanage, 81, top-flight defensive catcher for the Detroit Tigers from 1909 to 1920 and in 1925; holds American League record for assists by a catcher in a season (212 in 1911). 
November 12 – Fred Hutchinson, 45, for whom the Seattle cancer research and therapy center is named; manager of the Cincinnati Reds from mid-July 1959 until taking a medical leave for cancer treatments in mid-August 1964; led Reds to 1961 National League pennant; previously an All-Star pitcher (1939–1940 and 1946–1953) and manager (1952–1954) of the Detroit Tigers, and pilot of the St. Louis Cardinals (1956–1958), where he was selected 1957 MLB Manager of the Year; inspired creation of the Hutch Award.
November 13 –  Bris Lord, 81, outfielder who played for the Cleveland Naps, Philadelphia Athletics and Boston Braves in part of eight seasons spanning 1905–1913.
November 16 – Yam Yaryan, 72, backup catcher for the Chicago White Sox in the 1921 and 1922 seasons.
November 19 – Fred Hofmann, 70, who spent 36 years in the major leagues as a catcher, coach and scout, and also won two minor league pennants as a manager.
November 27 – Art Gleeson, 58, play-by-play sportscaster who described MLB games for the New York Yankees (1951–1952), the Mutual Network Game of the Day (1953–1959), and Boston Red Sox (1960–1964).

December
December 1 – Barbara Rotvig, 35, All-American Girls Professional Baseball League pitcher for the Kenosha Comets.
December 5 – Ed Wingo, 69, Canadian catcher who played for the Philadelphia Athletics in the 1920 season.
December 6 – Bobby Keefe, 82, pitcher who played for the New York Highlanders and Cincinnati Reds in a span of three seasons from 1907–1912.
December 7 – Bill Karlon, 55, outfielder who played in two games for the New York Yankees in 1930.
December 13 – Hank Erickson, 57, catcher for the 1935 Cincinnati Reds.
December 15 – Paul Wachtel, 76, pitcher for the 1917 Brooklyn Robins.
December 21 – Delos Brown, 72, pinch hitter who appeared in one game for the Chicago White Sox in 1914.
December 22 – Lou Fiene, 79, pitcher who played from 1906 through 1909 for the Chicago White Sox. 
December 27 – Art Phelan, 77, third baseman who played for the Cincinnati Reds and Chicago Cubs in part of five seasons spanning 1910–1915.
December 31 – Bobby Byrne, 80, speedy third baseman who played eleven seasons from 1907–1917, most prominently with the 1909 St. Louis Cardinals World Series champion team.
December 31 – Red Rollings, 60, utility infielder/outfielder who played for the 1927–1928 Boston Red Sox and 1930 Boston Braves.
December 31 – Doc Wallace, 71, shortstop who played for Philadelphia Phillies in the 1919 season.

References